The Treaty of Angoulême was signed on 30 April 1619 between Queen Marie de Medici and her son, King Louis XIII of France in Angoulême, France. The accord was negotiated by Cardinal Richelieu and it officially ended the civil war in France between supporters of Queen Marie and supporters of King Louis. Moreover, the agreement established lines of reconciliation between mother and son.

See also
List of treaties

References

External links
Encyclopædia Britannica - France
Humanities Web - Grand Siecle (1598–1715)
Project Gutenberg - A Popular History of France From The Earliest Times

1619 in France
1619 treaties
Angoulême
Angoulême